Victor Zilberman (born 20 September 1947) is a retired boxer from Romania. He competed in three consecutive Summer Olympics, starting in 1968 (Mexico City). He also won 8 national senior titles and two silver medals at the European Amateur Boxing Championships.

Born in Bucharest, Zilberman had his best result at the 1976 Summer Olympics in Montreal. There he won a bronze medal in the welterweight division (– 67 kg) after being defeated in the semifinals by eventual winner Jochen Bachfeld of East Germany. After the competition, he defected to Canada. 

Zilberman is Jewish.

Olympic results 
1968: Mexico City (as a welterweight)
Lost to Joseph Bessala (Cameroon) TKO 3 (quarterfinal match)

1972: Munich (as a welterweight)
 Round of 64: Lost to David Jackson (Uganda) by decision, 2–3

Montreal: 1976 (as a welterweight)
 Round of 64: bye
 Round of 32: Defeated Amon Kotey (Ghana) by walkover
 Round of 16: Defeated Colin Jones (Great Britain) by decision, 5–0
 Quarterfinal: Defeated Carlos Santos (Puerto Rico) by decision, 3–2
 Semifinal: Lost to Jochen Bachfeld (East Germany) by decision, 2-3 (won bronze medal)

References

 databaseOlympics

External links

1947 births
Sportspeople from Bucharest
Boxers at the 1968 Summer Olympics
Boxers at the 1972 Summer Olympics
Boxers at the 1976 Summer Olympics
Living people
Medalists at the 1976 Summer Olympics
Olympic boxers of Romania
Olympic bronze medalists for Romania
Romanian defectors
Romanian male boxers
Romanian emigrants to Canada
Welterweight boxers
Jewish Romanian sportspeople
Jewish boxers